Events from the year 1455 in Scotland.

Incumbents
Monarch – James II

Events
 1 May – Battle of Arkinholm ends in a decisive victory for supporters of James II against the rebel Douglases

Deaths
 Archibald Douglas, Earl of Moray, nobleman (born 1426)
 Hugh Douglas, Earl of Ormonde, nobleman (unknown)

References

 
Years of the 15th century in Scotland